Islands wolf may refer to:

 The Alexander Archipelago wolf, which is nicknamed the "islands wolf".
 The Falkland Islands wolf, also known as a warrah.
 The Vancouver Island wolf, a subspecies of gray wolf.
 The Baffin Island wolf, a wolf exclusively found on Baffin Island and surrounding islands.
 Bernard's wolf, which is nicknamed the "Banks Island wolf".